David ben Joseph Samoscz (29 December 1789 – 29 April 1864) was a German author of Hebrew children's literature.

Born in Kempen, Province of Posen, he went at an early age to Breslau, where he was a tutor and private teacher until 1822, when he entered business. Having met with reverses he toward the end of his life devoted himself again to literature. He was a prolific author of stories for the young, written in Hebrew and adapted mainly from the German, and of textbooks of instruction in the Jewish religion.

Work
Samoscz contributed Hebrew poems to periodicals, such as Bikkure ha-Ittim, and to the works of his Breslau friends, M. B. Friedenthal, Jacob Raphael Fürstenthal, and others. His other works include the following:

  History of the conversion of Joseph Steblitzki, written in German with Hebrew characters.
 
 
 
  Reply to a critique by J. H. Miro.
 
 
  On the discovery of America, after Campe.
  Also after Campe.
 
 
  Textbook of Hebrew instruction in three parts.
  Poem in honor of the visit of King Frederick William III to Breslau.
  Based on Johann Hübner's Christian Bible for children.
  Elegy on the death of Frederick William III.

References
 

1789 births
1864 deaths
19th-century German Jews
19th-century German male writers
19th-century German poets
19th-century Prussian people
German children's writers
German male poets
German-language writers
Hebrew-language poets
Jewish German writers
Jewish poets
Jewish translators
People from Kępno County
People of the Haskalah
Translators from German
Translators to Hebrew
Writers from Wrocław